Dragon's blood is a bright red resin obtained from a number of distinct plants.

Dragon's blood, dragon blood, or dragon-blood may also refer to:

 Dragon's blood tree, a common name for several plants
Croton draco, a spurge in the genus Croton
Daemonorops draco, a palm in genus Daemonorops
Dracaena draco, a tree native to the Canary Islands
Pterocarpus officinalis, a tree in genus Pterocarpus
Dracaena cinnabari, also called the Socotra dragon tree
Harungana madagascariensis, a flowering plant found in Madagascar
Dota: Dragon's Blood, a 2021 animated television series
Dragon's Blood, a 1982 novel by Jane Yolen
Dragonsblood, a novel by Todd McCaffrey
The Dragon's Blood, 1957 Italian film also known as "Sigfrido"
In mythology, the blood of a (slain) dragon

See also
 Far Cry 3: Blood Dragon (2013 video game)
 Blood of the Dragon (disambiguation)